The Open Engie de Touraine (previously known as the Open GDF Suez de Touraine) is a tournament for professional female tennis players played on indoor hard courts. The event is classified as a $25,000 ITF Women's Circuit tournament and has been held in Joué-lès-Tours, France, since from 2005 to 2018. From 2005 till 2016, the event was a $50,000 tournament. The tournament was not held from 2019 to 2021, but returned in 2022 as a $25,000 event.

Past finals

Singles

Doubles

External links
 ITF search
 Official website 

ITF Women's World Tennis Tour
Hard court tennis tournaments
Tennis tournaments in France
Recurring sporting events established in 2005
Recurring sporting events disestablished in 2018